Penstylhamaparvovirus is the name of a genus of viruses in the subfamily Hamaparvovirinae of the virus family Parvoviridae. Shrimps and  insects serve as natural hosts. There is only one species in this genus: Decapod penstylhamaparvovirus 1.

Structure
Viruses in Penstylhamaparvovirus are non-enveloped, with icosahedral and round geometries, and T=1 symmetry. The diameter is around 21-22 nm. Genomes are linear, around 4kb in length.

Life cycle
Viral replication is nuclear. Entry into the host cell is achieved by attachment to host receptors, which mediates clathrin-mediated endocytosis. Replication follows the rolling-hairpin model. DNA-templated transcription, with some alternative splicing mechanism is the method of transcription. The virus exits the host cell by nuclear pore export. Shrimps and insects serve as the natural host.

References

External links
 Viralzone: Penstyldensovirus
 ICTV

Parvoviruses
Virus genera